Thirukkarugavur is a village in the Papanasam taluk of Thanjavur district, Tamil Nadu, India.

Demographics 

As per the 2001 census, Thirukkarugavur had a total population of 1715 with 850 males and 865 females. The literacy rate was 69.15.

Nearest places
Arundavapuram-14.2 km

Kambarnatham-13.2 km

Thirubuvanam-22 km

Temples
Thirukkarugavur is famous for Garbharakshambigai Temple dedicated to Lord Shiva. This temple is situated on the banks of Vettar River.

References 

 

Villages in Thanjavur district